Radical 25 or radical divination is one of the 23 Kangxi radicals (214 radicals total) composed of two strokes.

In the Kangxi Dictionary, there are 45 characters (out of 49,030) to be found under this radical.

 is also the 9th indexing component in the Table of Indexing Chinese Character Components predominantly adopted by Simplified Chinese dictionaries published in mainland China.  is the only associated indexing component affiliated to the principal indexing component .

Evolution

Derived characters

Literature

External links

Unihan Database - U+535C

025
009